Acker comes from German or Old English, meaning "ploughed field"; it is related to or an alternate spelling of the word acre. Therefore, Ackermann means "ploughman". Ackerman is also a common Ashkenazi Jewish surname of Yiddish origin with the same meaning. The Ashkenazi surname Ackerman sometimes refers to the town of Akkerman in Bessarabia, south-west of Odessa.

People 
 A. Bernard Ackerman (1936–2008), American physician and dermatologist
 Alf Ackerman (1929–1988), South African footballer
 Allan Ackerman, American magician
 Andrea Ackerman, American artist, theorist and writer
 Annie Ackerman (1914-1989), American political activist
 Arlene Ackerman (1947–2013), American educator
 Andy Ackerman (born ), American director and producer
 Bernice Ackerman (1925–1995), American meteorologist
 Bettye Ackerman (1924–2006), American actress
 Blaster Al Ackerman (1939–2013), American mail artist and writer
 Brady Ackerman, American sports commentator
 Bruce Ackerman (born 1943), American law professor
 Carl W. Ackerman (1890–1970),  American journalist and author
 Chad Ackerman (born 1983), American rock singer-songwriter, musician, writer and artist
 Craig Ackerman (born ), radio play-by-play announcer
 Caroline Iverson Ackerman (1918-2012), American aviator, journalist, reporter and educator
 Dan Ackerman (born 1974), radio deejay and journalist
 Diane Ackerman (born 1948), American author, poet, and naturalist
 Dick Ackerman (born 1942), American politician
 Don Ackerman (1930–2011), American basketball player
 Elliot Ackerman (born 1980), American author
 Edward Augustus Ackerman (1911-1973), American geographer and an authority
 Ernest Robinson Ackerman (1863–1931), American politician
 F. Duane Ackerman (born 1942), American businessman
 Felicia Nimue Ackerman (born 1947), American author, poet, and philosopher
 Forrest J Ackerman (1916–2008), American science fiction writer and editor
 Frank Ackerman (1946–2019), American economist
 Frans Ackerman (–1387), Flemish statesman
 Gary Ackerman (born 1942), American politician
 George W. Ackerman (1884–1962), American photographer
 Gordon Ackerman, American journalist and photographer
 Graham Ackerman (born 1983), American gymnast
 Harold A. Ackerman (1928–2009), United States federal judge
 Harry Ackerman (1912–1991), American television producer
 Hylton Ackerman (1947–2009), South African cricketer
 H. D. Ackerman (born 1973), South African cricketer
 James Ackerman (disambiguation)
 Jay Ackerman (1933–2007), American farmer and politician
 Jennifer Ackerman (born 1959), American nature writer
 Jerome and Evelyn Ackerman, American designers
 Joanne Leedom-Ackerman (born 1947), American novelist, short story writer and journalist
 John Ackerman (disambiguation)
 John William Ackerman (1825-1905), South African knight
 José Chlimper Ackerman (born 1955), Peruvian banker and politician
 Justin Ackerman (born 1992), South African rugby union player
 Karen Ackerman (born 1951), American children's author
 Keith Ackerman (born 1946), American bishop
 Ken Ackerman, American television news anchor
 Ken Ackerman (radio announcer) (1922-2017), American radio announcer, disc jockey, and news anchor.
 Lauren Ackerman (1905–1993), American physician & pathologist
 Leslie Ackerman (born 1956), American actress
 Loni Ackerman (born 1949), American musical theatre actress
 Malin Åkerman (born 1978), Swedish-American actress, model and singer
 Marianne Ackerman (born 1952), Canadian playwright, novelist, and journalist
 Marques Ackerman (born 1996), South African first-class cricketer
 Martin S. Ackerman (1932–1993), American lawyer and businessman
 Maya Ackerman, Russian-American computer scientist
 Mia Ackerman (born 1965), American politician
 Nate Ackerman (born 1978), British-American logician and wrestler
 Nathan Ackerman (1908–1971), American psychiatrist and family therapist
 Paul Ackerman (1908–1977), American music journalist
 Paula Ackerman (1893–1989), first American female rabbi
 Peter Ackerman (born 1946), British businessman
 Peter Ackerman (playwright), American playwright, actor, and screenwriter
 Ralph Ackerman (1941–2008), photographer and independent filmmaker
 Raymond Ackerman (born 1931), South African businessman
 Raymond Ackerman, American filmmaker
 Richard Henry Ackerman (1903–1992), American bishop
 Rick Ackerman (born 1959), American football player
 Robert Ackerman (disambiguation)
 Roy Ackerman (1942-2017), English restaurateur
 Shelley Ackerman (born 1953), American astrologer and actress
 Sherry L. Ackerman, American academic and dressage clinician
 Spencer Ackerman, American reporter and blogger
 Susan Ackerman (disambiguation)
 Thomas E. Ackerman (born 1948), American cinematographer
 T. J. Ackerman (born 1975), former Canadian football offensive tackle
 Tom Ackerman (born 1972), American football player
 Tom Ackerman (basketball), American basketball player and coach
 Tony Ackerman (born 1984), English former professional footballer
 Tracy Ackerman, British singer and songwriter
 Travis Ackerman (born 1999), South African cricketer
 Tusten Ackerman (1901–1997), American basketball player
 Val Ackerman (born 1959), American attorney, sports executive, and basketball player
 William Ackerman (born 1949), American guitarist, composer, and founder of Windham Hill Records
 Willie Ackerman (1939–2012), American drummer
 Matthew Ackerman Tessier (1985-) American Hotdog Farmer

Characters 
 Kenny Ackerman, from Attack on Titan
 Levi Ackerman, from Attack on Titan
 Mikasa Ackerman, from Attack on Titan

See also 
 Ackerman (disambiguation)
 Akkerman (surname)
 Ackermann (surname)
 Akerman
 Åkerman, a Swedish surname
 Ackermans (disambiguation)

References

External links 
 Ackerman Last Name Origin – The Internet Surname Database

German-language surnames
Yiddish-language surnames